This is the complete list of African Games medalists in women's athletics from 1965 to 2015.

Current Program

100 metres

200 metres

400 metres

800 metres

1500 metres

3000 metres steeplechase

5000 metres

10,000 metres

Half marathon

100 metres hurdles

400 metres hurdles

High jump

Pole vault

Long jump

Triple jump

Shot put

Discus throw

Hammer throw

Javelin throw

Heptathlon

20 kilometres walk

4 × 100 metres relay

4 × 400 metres relay

Discontinued events

3000 metres

Marathon

80 metres hurdles

Pentathlon

5000 metres track walk

10 kilometres walk

References
All-Africa Games medal winners up to 2003

African Games
African Games